Yizheng is a county-level city under the administration of the prefecture-level city of Yangzhou, Jiangsu province, China, with a population of about 600,000 (2007). It borders the prefecture-level divisions of Chuzhou (Anhui) to the north, Nanjing to the west, and Zhenjiang to the south.

History

Etymology 
In 1013, the statues of several preceding emperors of the Song were cast in Jian'an military prefecture. Thus, the region was changed into Zhenzhou (Zhen prefecture). Later, with the emperor's favor, a Taoist temple named Yizhen was also built, at where the former furnace was situated. Both zhen and yizhen mean "lifelikeness" in Chinese. The prefecture was named after the temple in 1117. Yizhen county was renamed Yizheng in 1723, because the homophone "zhen()" as a part of the Yongzheng Emperor's Chinese name was deemed to be ineffable.

Geography 
On the northern bank of Yangzhou, Yizheng is situated in the north of Jiangsu, and the Yangtze River lies in its southern territory. The city borders Luhe District of Nanjing on west, the urban area of Yangzhou on east and Tianchang of Anhui Province on north.

Two major bodies of water, the Yangtze River and the Grand Canal, run through Yizheng from west to east and from north to south, respectively, dividing the city into four fractions.

Climate

Administrative divisions
In the present, Yizheng City has 9 towns.

Economy 
Local Yizheng Chemical Fiber of Sinopec was the fourth-largest worldwide polyester maker in the 1990s.

Transportation

Road

Expressways 
G40 Shanghai–Xi'an Expressway

National Highway 
China National Highway 328

Railway 
The passengers service of Yizheng Station astride the Nanjing–Qidong railway was suspended since July 1, 2013.

References

External links

Official website of Yizheng Government 
Yizheng City English Guide 
 "Illustrated Album of Yangzhou Prefecture", from 1573-1620, has illustrations of Yizheng District

 
Cities in Jiangsu
County-level divisions of Jiangsu
Yangzhou
Populated places on the Yangtze River